Aili Keskitalo (born 29 October 1968) is a Norwegian Sami politician representing the Norwegian Sámi Association (NSR), who has served as the president of the Sami Parliament for three terms, from 2005 to 2007, 2013 to 2016 and 2017 to 2021.

Prior to her current presidency, she served as president of the Sami Parliament of Norway in 2005, the third in its history and the first female President of any Sami Parliament. She stepped down in September 2007. The collapse of her coalition made way for the first ever non-NSR presidency, led by Egil Olli from the Norwegian Labour Party. She was re-elected in 2013 and served until 2016. The year after she returned for her third stint as president of the Sami Parliament. In 2020, Keskitalo announced that she would not seek re-election in the 2021 election.

She has a Master in Public Administration from Copenhagen Business School, in which she compared the school systems in Norway and Greenland

Keskitalo was the first Sámi President whose mother tongue was not Sámi but Norwegian. However, she speaks Northern Sami fluently.

See also
 Sámi politics
 Sámi Parliament of Russia
 Norwegian Sami Association
 Keskitalo's Third Council

References 

1968 births
Living people
Members of the Sámi Parliament of Norway
Norwegian Sámi people
Norwegian Sámi politicians
Copenhagen Business School alumni
21st-century Norwegian women politicians
21st-century Norwegian politicians